This list of songs about Detroit contains any songs about or involving the U.S. city of Detroit.

0-9
"40 Hour Week" - Alabama
"8 Mile" - Eminem
"8 Mile Boogie" - Pat Flowers
"8 Miles" - Obie Trice
"8 Miles And Runnin'" – Jay-Z and Freeway
"25th Floor" - Patti Smith
"313" - Alley Life

A
"A Long Time" - Mayer Hawthorne
"Alive in 5D" - Gardens
"All American Man" - KISS
"All My Life" - Blade Icewood
"All Over the World" - ELO
"American Bad Ass" - Kid Rock
"Amityville" - Eminem, from The Marshall Mathers LP (2000)
"Anaconda" - Nicki Minaj
"Ancestors" - Oblisk
"April in the D" - The Victorious Secrets
"RGF Island" - Fetty Wap

B
"Baby Come Home" - Kid Rock
"Back to Detroit" - Nikki Corvette & the Stingrays
"Back to Detroit" - Wayne Kramer
"Back to Detroit (Motor City Remix)" - Beatdrum
"Backyard War" - Achromatik
"Beautiful" - Eminem 2009 rap rock
"Belle Isle Players" - Starski & Clutch
"Be My Lover" - Alice Cooper (often mistaken as "Detroit City")
"The Big Three Killed My Baby" - The White Stripes from The White Stripes (album) 1999
"Bitch Please II" - Eminem
"Black Day in July" - Gordon Lightfoot (from Canada)
"Bless You Boys" - Curtis Gladson and Loren Woods
"Blessed St. Anthony" - Ty Stone
"Blowing Up Detroit" - John Palumbo
"Born in Detroit," The Rockets
"Broke in Detroit (Again)" - The Dirtbombs
"Broken Man" - The Von Bondies
"Buried in Detroit" - Mike Posner

C
 "Cadillac Assembly Line" - Albert King
"Can't Tame The Lion" - Journey
"Christmas Eve on Woodward Avenue" - Karen Newman
 "C-I-T-Y" - John Cafferty & The Beaver Brown Band
"City of Boom" - Detroit Most Wanted
"Country Grammar" – Nelly
"Crank Dat Icewood" - Johnny King

D
"Da East" - Niko
"The D in Detroit" - The Anniversary
"Dancing in the Street" - Martha and the Vandellas (1964) (#2 Billboard Hot 100)
"Detroit (Born + Raised)" - André DeJuan, from his upcoming third studio album, I'm Not Me
"Detroit" - (from the Disney film, The Happiest Millionaire, introduced by John Davidson)
"Detroit" - David Reo
"Detroit" - Eddie "Guitar" Burns
"Detroit" - Esham (featuring TNT)
"Detroit" - Fireworks
"Detroit" - Laurent Garnier
"Detroit" - Green Concorde
"Detroit" - Ian Hunter
"Detroit"- Injecting Strangers
"Detroit (That's My Home Town)" - Kim Weston
"Detroit" - Mogue Doyle
"Detroit" - Morgan Geist
"Detroit" - Pato Margetic
"Detroit" - Primal Scream
"Detroit" - Rancid
"Detroit" - Red Hot Chili Peppers
"Detroit" - Royce Da 5'9"(featuring Travis Barker)
"Detroit" - Tyler Childers
"Detroit" - Va-Voom
"Detroit" - Spring King
"Detroit 4 Life" - A.W.O.L.
"Detroit 101" - City Squad
"Detroit 101" - Esham
"Detroit 442" - Blondie
"Detroit '67" - Sam Roberts Band
"Detroit Blues" - Diana Krall; Vince Benedetti
"Detroit Blues" - Tampa Red
"Detroit Breakdown" - The Bellrays
"Detroit Breakdown" - The J. Geils Band
"Detroit Breakdown" - The Gories
"Detroit City" - Alice Cooper
"Detroit City" - LetricKramer
"Detroit City (I Wanna Go Home)" - Bobby Bare (composed by Danny Dill)
"Detroit City" - Sonny B
"Detroit City" - Texas
"Detroit City Blues" - Fats Domino
"Detroit, Detroit" - Bugz
"Detroit, Detroit" - Erik Koskinen
"Detroit Diesel" - Alvin Lee
"Detroit Drive" - Eliza Neals
"Detroit Girl" - Raphael Saadiq
"Detroit Girls" - Starz
"Detroit Has a Skyline" - HiFi Handgrenades
"Detroit Has a Skyline" - Superchunk
"Detroit Iron" - The Darts
"Detroit Jump" - Big Maceo Merriweather
"Detroit Lady" - Motor City Josh
"Detroit, Lift Up Your Weary Head! (Rebuild! Restore! Reconsider!)" - Sufjan Stevens from Michigan (album) 2003
"Detroit Michigan" - Ronnie Love
"Detroit, Michigan"- Kid Rock from Rebel Soul 2012
"Detroit, Michigan" - The Peps
"Detroit Moan"- Victoria Spivey
"Detroit Murderous" - Big Hoodoo (from the album 'Crystal Skull')
"Detroit Niggaz" - Street Lord'z
"The Detroit River Dirty Blues" - Michael Katon
"Detroit Rock City" - KISS 1976
"Detroit Rock City Homage" - Forced Anger
"Detroit Special" - Big Bill Broonzy
"Detroit Sound" - Soul Designer
"Detroit Stand Up" - Ray O'Shea (featuring Big Herk, BO$$, Phohessuain, Esham, Malik (Eddie Kain), Al Nuke & Proof)
"Detroit State of Mind - Elzhi
"Detroit Style" - A1 People
"Detroit Summer" - Obie Trice
"Detroit Sunrise"- Dwele neo-soul, 2010
"Detroit Swing 66" - Gomez
"Detroit Swing City" - Alien Fashion Show
"Detroit Thang" - Kid Rock
"Detroit Tickets" - Apoptygma Berzerk
"Detroit Tin" - The Kursaal Flyers
"Detroit Vs. Everybody" - Eminem and others from Shady XV 2014
"Detroit was Built on Secrets"- Search the City
"Detroit Waves" - Matt Nathanson
"Detroit Women" - Stacia Petrie
"Detroit Winter - Platinum Pied Pipers (featuring MC Invincible)
"Detroit Zoo" - Disco D
"Detroiter, Part 2" - Bantam Rooster
"Devil's Night" - D12 2001, horrorcore
"Devil's Night" - Sonny B
"Devil Without A Cause" - Kid Rock
"Don't Stop Believin'" - Journey ("born and raised in south Detroit")
"Don't Shut Em Down" - Flogging Molly
"Dog Eat Dog" - Ted Nugent
"Dope Job Homeless" - Obie Trice
"Detroit Slums" -Back In Spades
"Detroit Rock & Roll" - Frijid Pink
"Doctor Detroit" - Devo

E
"Eastern Market" - Yusef Lateef
"Elizabeth Parker" - Dave Caruso

F
"forty hour week" - Alabama
"Fire Editorial" - The Mountain Goats
"For The D" - Guilty Simpson
"Foul Mouff" - Paradime (featuring Kid Rock)
"Fuck Off" -Kid Rock (featuring Eminem)
"From The D" -Eminem, Trick Trick, and Kid Rock
"Feel Older Now" - Flo & Eddie

G
"Geography" - Lali Puna
"Ghetto Zone" - Inner City Posse
"Gangster Funk" Prince Vince and the Hip Hop Force
"God Bless the USA" – Lee Greenwood
"Going Back to Motown" - John Palumbo
"Got No Place to Go" - Migrant Kids
"Guap" - Big Sean From Hall of Fame 2012
"Gone Long Gone" - Frijid Pink
"Great Time in Detroit" - Harmonie Park
"Gimme Gimme Good Lovin" - Adrenalin

H
"Halloween On Military Street" - Insane Clown Posse
"Hand Springs" - The White Stripes
"Hands Up For Detroit" - Matthew Dear (co-produced by Ghettotech pioneer Disco D)
"Happy Dagger - Millions Of Brazilians
"Hard Scratch Pride" - Whitey Morgan and the 78's
"Heaven" - Uncle Kracker (featuring Kid Rock and Paradime)
"Hello, Detroit" - Daniel Boaventura
"Hello, Detroit" - Sammy Davis, Jr.
"Hello, Detroit" - Sonny Turner
"Here At Home (In Detroit City)" - Stony Creek
"Hillbilly Highway (song)" - Steve Earle
"Hockeytown" - Joe Lynn Turner
"Hokus Pocus"- Insane Clown Posse
"Horkenbach Blues (Why is Everyone Discriminatin' 'gainst Me?)" - The Dennis Horkenbach Trio
"Horribly Horrifying" -Violent J
"Hey Now (Motor City) - The Vandalias
"Horizontal Bop" - Bob Seger from Against the Wind 1980
"Hotel Yorba" - The White Stripes 2001
"Home Town" - Big Sean
"Hometown" - Mitch Ryder from Naked But Not Dead
"Hypnotize (The Notorious B.I.G. song)" - Notorious B.I.G

I
"I Am" - Kid Rock
"I Am Detroit" - Electric Six
"I Care About Detroit" - Smokey Robinson & The Miracles
"I Love Detroit" - Amboy Rambler
"I Wanna Go Back" - Kid Rock
"In Detroit" - Delta Twins ( https://deltatwins.bandcamp.com/track/in-detroit-2 )
"In Detroit" ( Featuring TNT ) - Esham
"In The City" - Marquise Porter
"In Thee" - Blue Öyster Cult
"Inmates" - The Good Life
"Inner City Blues" - Rodriquez, aka Sixto Diaz Rodriguez
"Inner City Blues (Make Me Wanna Holler)" - Marvin Gaye from What's Going On 1971
"Intro" - Kid Rock
"It's Been A Long Time" - Mayer Hawthorne
"It's Still East Detroit to Me" - Kid Rock
"It's So Cold in the D" - T-Baby

K
"Kill Ya Self" - Trick Trick ( DJ Drama: Welcome To Detroit Gangsta Grillz Edition )
"Krack Rocks" ( Featuring Uncle Kracker ) - Kid Rock 1996

L
"LafaLetItRock. Bob Segerette Blues" - The White Stripes ( Features names of Detroit streets )
"Landing In Detroit" - The Detroit Grand Pubahs
"Last Time I Saw Richard, The" - Joni Mitchell
"Leaving Detroit" - Roses Are Red
 "Leaving Detroit" - Eliza Neals
"Let It Fly" - Trick Trick ft.Ice Cube
"Lighters Up" - Lil' Kim
"Lightning Over Detroit" - Richard Madow
"Life In The D" - Brendan Benson
"Lipstick" - Kip Moore
"Live" ( Featuring Esham ) - Kid Rock
"The Load-Out" - Jackson Browne
"Lose Yourself" - Eminem from 8 Mile, 2002, video shows the Ambassador Bridge
"Love For My City" - Blade Icewood ft. Juan & Jesse James
"Line #7" - Dierks Bentley

M
"Made in Hockeytown" - Red Wings - Paul Shonk http://www.paulshonk.com/
"Man From Detroit" - Hard Place
"Moths And Lizards In Detroit" - Andy Roberts
"Michigan & Trumbull" - The Original Brothers and Sisters of Love
"Motor City" - The Satintones
"Motor City" - Randy Weeks
"Motor City Baby" - The Dirtbombs
"Motor City Boogie" - York Brothers
"Motor City Girl" - The Badways
"Motor City Is Burning" - MC5; John Lee Hooker
"Motor City Madhouse" - Ted Nugent 1975
"Motor City Serenade" - Stewart Francke
"Motortown" - Kane Gang
"M.O.T.O.W.N. ( Murderous Outcold Town Of Wild Niggaz )" - Big Herk
"Motown Country" - CURTICE/MARKLEY & Motown Station
"Motown Music" - Rod Stewart 1991 (#10 on Billboard Hot 100)
"Motown Junk" - Manic Street Preachers (Welsh band)
"Motown Never Sounded So Good" - Less Than Jake
”Movin’ Along (A Song For Detroit)” - Alma Smith
"Move To Detroit" - Eddie "Flashin" Fowlkes
"Murder City Nights" - Radio Birdman

N
"Need Somebody" - Subdudes
"New Detroit" - Neon Blonde
"Nobody in Detroit" - Howling Diablos
"New Nathans Detroit"- Braid (band)
"Northern Soul"- Above and Beyond (band)

O
"Ode To Detroit" - Wally Pleasant
"The Old Stuff" - Garth Brooks
"One Piece At A Time" - Johnny Cash
”One Woman Army - Porcelain Black
"One Way Out" - thenewno2
"Out" - Insane Clown Posse

P
"Paid" - Kid Rock
"Panic In Detroit" - David Bowie
"Papa Hobo" - Paul Simon
"Party on 4th Street" - Black Nasty (available on the "Funky Funky Detroit" compilation)
"Passport to Detroit" - Joe Strummer
"Put Your Hands Up 4 Detroit" - Fedde Le Grand (#1 UK Singles Chart)
"Planet of Visions" - Kraftwerk
"Please II" - Eminem
"Posse On Verner* - Insane Clown Posse
"the Power's Out" -Flogging Molly
"Peacemaker" - Green Day (The song is part of a rock opera album which takes place in Detroit. The lyric "I am a killjoy, from Detroit"). 21st Century Breakdown
"Pride of the Wolverines" - John Philip Sousa

Q
"Queen of Detroit" - +/- (band)

R
'Rainin in Detroit" - Eliza Neals
 "Renaissance State of Mind" - Ro Spit & Monica Blaire
"Represent" - Stretch Money
"Reputation" - Apollo Brown & Guilty Simpson
"Ride" - Royce Da 5'9" ft. Big Herk & Juan
"Rise Again" - Hush
"Rock City" - Royce da 5'9" featuring Eminem
"Rock & Roll (The Velvet Underground song)" - Detroit (band)
"Rock N Roll Jesus" - Kid Rock
"Roll On (Kid Rock song)" - Kid Rock 2008
"Rollin' On The Island" ( Featuring Wes Chill And Prince Vince ) - Kid Rock
"Rose Darling" - Steely Dan

S
"So Detroit"- Slight Return feat. The A.I. Fam wsg Tony "T Money" Green
"Say Nice Things About Detroit" - They Might Be Giants
"Son Of Detroit" - Kid Rock
"South Telegraph Rd" - Amboy Rambler
"Second Home" - Big A
"Seized Up" - The Suicide Machines
"Shake That" - Eminem feat. Nate Dogg
"Shake Your Detroit Right" - Slight Return feat. George Clinton
"Shuttin' Detroit Down" - John Rich
"Sister" - Sufjan Stevens
"Six Mile Stretch"- Sam Donahue and Ken Meisel
"Sleepin Tonight In Detroit"- The Disregarded
"So Far..." - Eminem
"Son Of Detroit" - Kid Rock
"Southwest Song" - Insane Clown Posse
"Spaghetti a Detroit" - Fred Bongusto
"Straight From The D" - Mr Knox
"Stay True To Ya City" - Natas
"She Was Hot" - The Rolling Stones

T
The D- Slight Return
 "Take His Life" - Royce da 5'9" & Tre Little
 "Take Money To Make Money" - Stretch Money
"Taking It To Detroit" - The Good Rats -
"Telegraph Road" - Dire Straits (from UK)
"That's Detroit To Me" - King Gordy
"The Arms Forest" - The Hard Lessons
"The D In Detroit" - Anniversary
"The Fire Inside - Bob Seger
"The Girl from Detroit City - Suzi Quatro
"The Heart of Rock & Roll" - Huey Lewis & the News
"The Smog" - Insane Clown Posse
"These Hands (song for Detroit)" - Jason Roseboom
"There They Go" - Obie Trice ( Featuring Eminem And Big Herk )
"This One Or That One" - Tyvek
"Tooling For Anus" - The Meatmen  ( Chorus mentions Detroit and suburban clubs such as, 'Bookies', 'Nunzio's' and 'Menjo's'. )
"Tommy Pays the Rent" - Manolete (Mentions growing up in Michigan and Detroit)

U
"U Can Get Fucked Up" - Trick Trick (featuring Goon Sqwad)
"Up on Twelfth Street" Sir Mack Rice

W
Welcome To The D- Slight Return
 "W.T.P. (White Trash Party)" - Eminem
"We Almost Lost Detroit" - Dale Earnhardt Jr. Jr.
"We Almost Lost Detroit" - Gil Scott-Heron
"We Almost Lost Detroit" - Natas
"We Almost Lost Detroit" - Marquise Porter
"Welcome 2 Detroit" - Trick Trick (featuring Eminem)
"Welcome 2 The Party" - Kid Rock
"Welcome Back To Detroit - Mariner
"Welcome To Detroit" - Jay-Dee
"Welcome To Detroit" - Eminem
"Welcome To Detroit City" - Obie Trice
"What I Learned Out On The Road" - Kid Rock
"Where My Nigz At ?" - Esham
"Where the Money Is Made" Detroit Most Wanted
"Wreck Of The Edmund Fitzgerald, The" - Gordon Lightfoot
"Worse Than Detroit" - Robert Plant
"Who's Afraid of Detroit" - Claude VonStroke

Y
"Yellow Brick Road" - Eminem
"You Can Make It" - Achromatik feat. Royce da 5'9"
"You Never Met A Mother Fucker Quite Like Me" - Kid Rock 2002
"You Don't Want None of This" - A.W.O.L

References

 
Songs